Alan Lyell (4 November 1917 – 2 November 2007) was a Scottish dermatologist who described Lyell's syndrome.

References

1917 births
2007 deaths
Scottish dermatologists